William Gillespie Pickrel (February 1, 1888 – March 7, 1966) was an American attorney and politician who served as the 40th and 43rd lieutenant governor of Ohio in 1928 and 1931–1933 under Governor A. Victor Donahey.

Biography
William G. Pickrel, nicknamed "Big Bill," was born in Jackson, Ohio on February 1, 1888, the son of D. L. and Martha (née Miller) Pickrel.  He was educated in Jackson and Dayton, graduated from Miami University in Oxford, Ohio in 1910, received a law degree from the University of Cincinnati College of Law in 1912, and practiced law in Dayton.

Pickrel was a civic and legal activist, including serving as President of the Dayton and Ohio Bar Associations, a state bar examiner, a director of the Dayton Chamber of Commerce and a trustee of Miami University.

A member of the Democratic Party, Pickrel ran unsuccessfully for the United States House of Representatives in 1920.  In 1928 Cyrus Locher was appointed to the United States Senate.  Lieutenant Governor Earl D. Bloom resigned in order to accept appointment to Locher's place as state Secretary of Commerce, and Pickrel was then appointed to the lieutenant governor's office vacated by Bloom.  Pickrel completed Bloom's term, serving from April to November, 1928.

In 1930 Pickrel was the successful Democratic nominee for lieutenant governor and served one term, January 1931 to January 1933. He was renominated for lieutenant governor in 1932, but withdrew before the general election.  He was an unsuccessful candidate for the Democratic nomination for Governor in 1934.

In 1944 he ran unsuccessfully for the United States Senate against Republican incumbent Robert A. Taft; he received 49.7% of the vote to Taft's 50.3%. He died of a heart ailment in a Dayton hospital on March 7, 1966.

References

1966 deaths
1888 births
People from Jackson, Ohio
Politicians from Dayton, Ohio
Miami University alumni
University of Cincinnati College of Law alumni
Ohio lawyers
Ohio Democrats
Lieutenant Governors of Ohio
20th-century American politicians
20th-century American lawyers